Kangaride (Available in French under AmigoExpress) is a private Canadian company founded in 2006 that provides a ridesharing platform for posting and booking long-distance rides in North America. Kangaride appeared on Dragons Den Season 7 episode 19.

History
Kangaride was created by Marc-Olivier Vachon in 2006. The company had 7,000 members in its first year of activity, and over 33,000 members as of 2009.

Description
Through Kangaride’s website, drivers and passengers connect to rideshare together. Drivers post their rides and the empty seats in their vehicle, and passengers search for rides and book a seat in the one that gets them where they need to go. Kangaride has over 475,000 members and hundreds of rides booked each week.

Kangaride has a three-pronged approach to making ridesharing safer. All rides are rated by the driver and passengers and drivers’ overall ratings are visible to passengers before booking.

Kangaride is considered much safer than other car-sharing services because a background check is performed on all drivers to ensure they have a valid drivers license.

Kangaride operates as Amigo Express in French.

Notes

References

External links
 

2006 establishments in Quebec
Carsharing
Transport companies established in 2006
Transport companies of Canada
Transport in Montreal
Quebec websites